Leslie Mobbs (8 May 1926 – 20 August 2005) was a South African cricketer. He played in one first-class match for Border in 1958/59.

See also
 List of Border representative cricketers

References

External links
 

1926 births
2005 deaths
South African cricketers
Border cricketers
Cricketers from East London, Eastern Cape